Paka Dekha is a Bengali comedy drama film directed by  Arabinda Mukhopadhyay and produced by Mohan Mallick based on a story of Balai Chand Mukhopadhyay in the same name. This film was released in 1980 in the banner of Reba Films. Hemanta Mukhopadhyay scored the music in the film.

Plot
Aparna's father, a police officer, fixes her marriage of his own choice. Aparna does not agree with her father and she flees from home. Her father arrests Aparna's friends and interrogates them one by one.

Cast
 Utpal Dutt as Aparna's father
 Mahua Roychoudhury as Aparna
 Rabi Ghosh
 Tarun Kumar Chatterjee
 Santosh Dutta
 Sobha Sen
Kamu Mukherjee
 Haridhan Mukhopadhyay
 Koushik Bandyopadhyay
 Sambhu Bhattachayra
 Reba Debi
 N. Bishwanathan
 Banani Chowdhury
 Sailen Mukhopadhyay
 Kalyani Adhikari

Soundtrack
"Jadi Chao Jante Amra" - Arundhuti Holme Chowdhury, Sagar, Sudhin Dasgupta 
"Gaur Baran Santasi Ek" - Amal Mukhopadhya
"Tumi Kemonti Hobe" - Hemanta Mukhopadhyay
"Bhanur Pashe Chandra Jemon" - Tarun Bandhyapadhya

References

External links
 

1980 films
Bengali-language Indian films
1980 comedy-drama films
Films based on Indian novels
Films scored by Hemant Kumar
Indian comedy-drama films
1980s Bengali-language films
1980 comedy films
1980 drama films
Films based on works by Balai Chand Mukhopadhyay